The 1996 NCAA Division I women's basketball tournament took place March 15–31, 1996. The Final Four consisted of Connecticut, Georgia, Stanford, and Tennessee. Tennessee defeated Georgia 83–65 in the championship game.

Tournament records
 Three-point field goal percentage – Nykesha Sales, Connecticut, hit four of five three-point field goal attempts(80%) in the semi-final game against Tennessee, tying a record for three-point field goal percentage in a Final Four game, held by four other players.
 Three-point field goal percentage – Abby Conklin, Tennessee hit four of five three-point field goal attempts(80%) in the championship game against Georgia, tying a record for three-point field goal percentage in a Final Four game, held by four other players.
 Three-point field goals – Harvard hit 16 three-point field goals in a Mideast first-round game, setting the record for most three-point field goals in an NCAA tournament game, subsequently tied by two other teams.

Qualifying teams – automatic
Sixty-four teams were selected to participate in the 1996 NCAA Tournament. Thirty-one conferences were eligible for an automatic bid.

Qualifying teams – at-large
Thirty-three additional teams were selected to complete the sixty-four invitations.

Bids by conference
Thirty-one conferences earned an automatic bid.  In seventeen cases, the automatic bid was the only representative from the conference. Thirty-three additional at-large teams were selected from fourteen of the conferences.

First and second rounds

In 1996, the field remained at 64 teams. The teams were seeded, and assigned to four geographic regions, with seeds 1-16 in each region. In Round 1, seeds 1 and 16 faced each other, as well as seeds 2 and 15, seeds 3 and 14, seeds 4 and 13, seeds 5 and 12, seeds 6 and 11, seeds 7 and 10, and seeds 8 and 9. In the first two rounds, the top four seeds were given the opportunity to host the first-round game. In all cases, the higher seed accepted the opportunity.

The following table lists the region, host school, venue and the sixteen first and second round locations:

Regionals and Final Four

The Regionals, named for the general location, were held from March 23 to March 25 at these sites:

 East Regional  University Hall (University of Virginia), Charlottesville, Virginia (Host: University of Virginia)
 Midwest Regional  William R. Johnson Coliseum, Nacogdoches, Texas (Host: Stephen F. Austin University)
 West Regional  Hec Edmundson Pavilion, Seattle, Washington (Host: University of Washington)
 Mideast Regional  Rosemont Horizon, Rosemont, Illinois (Host: DePaul University)

Each regional winner advanced to the Final Four held March 29 and March 31 in Charlotte, North Carolina  at the Charlotte Coliseum, (co-hosted by Davidson College and UNC Charlotte).

Bids by state

The sixty-four teams came from thirty-two states, plus Washington, D.C. Texas and Tennessee had the most teams with five bids. Eighteen states did not have any teams receiving bids.

Brackets

East Region

Mideast Region

Midwest Region

West Region

Final Four – Charlotte, North Carolina

Record by conference
Sixteen conferences had more than one bid, or at least one win in NCAA Tournament play:

Fifteen conferences went 0-1: Big Sky Conference, Big South Conference, Big West Conference, Ivy League, MAAC, Mid-Continent, MEAC, Midwestern Collegiate, Missouri Valley Conference, North Atlantic Conference, Northeast Conference, Patriot League, Southern Conference, SWAC, and Trans America

All-Tournament team

 Michelle M. Marciniak, Tennessee
 Chamique Holdsclaw, Tennessee
 Tiffani Johnson, Tennessee
 La'Keshia Frett, Georgia
 Saudia Roundtree, Georgia

Game officials

 Art Bomegen (semifinal)
 Doug Cloud (semifinal)
 Wes Dean (semifinal)
 John Morningstar (semifinal)
 Bob Trammell (semifinal)
 Scott Yarborough (semifinal)
 Sally Bell (final)
 Dee Kantner (final)
 Violet Palmer (final) 
This was the first year the NCAA used three officials in tournament games, which was the standard for men's games since the 1978-79 season. Several conferences, including the SEC, assigned three officials to its regular season and conference tournament games for several seasons before the NCAA changed its rules.

See also
 1996 NCAA Division I men's basketball tournament
 1996 NCAA Division II women's basketball tournament
 1996 NCAA Division III women's basketball tournament
 1996 NAIA Division I women's basketball tournament
 1996 NAIA Division II women's basketball tournament

References

NCAA Division I women's basketball tournament
 
NCAA Division I women's basketball tournament
NCAA Division I women's basketball tournament
Basketball in Lubbock, Texas
Events in Lubbock, Texas
Sports competitions in Texas